Bertrand Bessières, 1st Baron Bessières (born 6 January 1773 in Prayssac; died 15 November 1855 in Chantilly), was a French general of the Napoleonic Wars. He was the younger brother of Marshal Jean-Baptiste Bessières.

Biography 
After serving with a good record in Italy, in Egypt and at Hohenlinden, Bertrand Bessières had a command in the Grande Armée, fought at Austerlitz and was subsequently promoted to brigadier general. In 1808 was sent to Spain, where he commanded a division in Catalonia and played a notable part at the action of Molins de Rey near Barcelona.

Disagreements with his superior, General Duhesme, led to his resignation, but he subsequently served with Napoleon in all the later campaigns of the empire and was wounded at Borodino and Leipzig.

His last public act was his defence of the unfortunate Marshal Ney. Placed on the retired list by the restored Bourbons, he spent the rest of his long life in retirement.

BERTRAND, B is one of the many names inscribed Arc De Triomphe.

1773 births
1855 deaths
People from Lot (department)
Barons of the First French Empire
French military personnel of the French Revolutionary Wars
French commanders of the Napoleonic Wars
Cavalry commanders
Names inscribed under the Arc de Triomphe